There are biblical translations into Hawaiian and Hawaii Pidgin which are the two main languages of Hawaii.

Hawaiian

A Hawaiian language translation was completed by New England Christian missionaries including Reverends Hiram Bingham, Asa Thurston, Lorrin Andrews, and Sheldon Dibble from 1800-1850. The Gospels (Matthew, Mark, Luke, and John) were translated in 1828. The rest of the New Testament was translated in 1832, the Old Testament was translated in 1839, and the translation was revised in 1868.

As recent research indicated, 25% of this version of the Bible was translated by Thurston, 20% by Bingham (who also did the coordination), 14% by Artemas Bishop (who later became a prominent missionary to Honolulu and was responsible for the first revision), and the rest by others.

As the Kingdom of Hawaii was toppled in the 1893 overthrow and became a United States territory, the Hawaiian language was banned in schools and was spoken less. However, in the second half of the 20th century, there was a Hawaiian language revitalization in which people became more interested in the native language, and more parents started to send their children to Hawaiian language immersion schools.

In the early 21st century, under the Hawaiian Bible Project supported by Partners In Development Foundation, the Hawaiian Bible called Ka Baibala Hemolele (the Holy Bible) was published in 2018 in print and electronic forms, using the Hawaiian text of the 19th century, but re-edited in modern Hawaiian orthography, using the diacritical marks, such as ʻOkina and Kahakō.

Hawaii Pidgin

The modern Hawaiian Pidgin English is to be distinguished from the indigenous Hawaiian language, which is still spoken. Da Jesus Book: Hawaii Pidgin New Testament is a translation of the New Testament into Hawaiian Pidgin. The book is 752 pages long, and was published by Wycliffe Bible Translators in 2000. It was translated by retired Cornell University linguistics professor Joseph Grimes, who worked on it with 27 pidgin speakers for 12 years. Subsequently, translation of the Old Testament commenced. In 2015, the Old Testament translation was roughly half completed, and in 2020, the translation was completed. The combined Old and New Testaments are called Da Good An Spesho Book.

Comparison

See also
Religion in Hawaii
Hawaiian religion

References

External links
 Baibala Hemolele - Hawaiian Bible 1868
 

Hawaiian
Hawaiian Pidgin